Asfaw Deble (born 13 February 1955) is an Ethiopian sprinter. He competed in the men's 400 metres at the 1980 Summer Olympics.

References

External links
 

1955 births
Living people
Athletes (track and field) at the 1980 Summer Olympics
Ethiopian male sprinters
Olympic athletes of Ethiopia
Place of birth missing (living people)